The HM 12 Fateh (or Hadid) is an Iranian 60mm mortar manufactured by the Ammunition & Metallurgy Industries Group, part of Iran's Defense Industries Organization. It is an unlicensed copy of Israel's Soltam 60 mm mortar. It is generally operated by two people but in urgent cases it can be operated by one as well.

Users 

 Popular Mobilization Forces
Northern Alliance

References 

Mortars of Iran
Islamic Republic of Iran Army